The FIH All-Star Teams are a group of selected players and coaches chosen every year after the recommendations and opinions of field hockey players, officials, coaches and journalists. These players are considered to have given their best during the year in every competition and contributed in some way to improve the sport itself. This award is given by the International Hockey Federation since the year 2006 both in men and women's category.

Men's

2006

Women's

2006

2007

2008

2009

2010

2011

References

Sports trophies and awards
Awards established in 2006
International Hockey Federation